Malekdeh (also Romanized as Malakdeh and Malek Deh; also known as Balakdeh) is a village in Aliabad-e Ziba Kenar Rural District, Lasht-e Nesha District, Rasht County, Gilan Province, Iran. At the 2006 census, its population was 187, in 59 families.

References 

Populated places in Rasht County